Stars Over Texas is a 1946 American Western film directed by Robert Emmett Tansey and starring Eddie Dean, Roscoe Ates, and Shirley Patterson.

Plot

Cast 

Eddie Dean as Eddie Dean
Flash as Flash - Eddie's Horse
Roscoe Ates as "Soapy" Jones
Shirley Patterson as Terry Lawrence
Lee Bennett as Waco Harper / Bert Ford
Lee Roberts as Hank Lawrence, Bar L
Kermit Maynard as Henchman Knuckles
Jack O'Shea as Ringo Evans, Cross E Ranch
Hal Smith as Peddler Tucker
Matty Roubert as Henchman Buggsy
Carl Mathews as Henchman Two-Horn
William Fawcett as "Judge" Diamond Smith
The Sunshine Boys as Singing Ranchhands

Soundtrack 
 Eddie Dean with the Sunshine Boys  - "Stars Over Texas" (written by Eddie Dean and Hal Blair)
 Eddie Dean with the Sunshine Boys  - "Sands of the Old Rio Grande" (written by Eddie Dean and Glenn Strange as Glen Strange)
 Eddie Dean with the Sunshine Boys  - "Fifteen Hundred and One Miles of Heaven" (written by Eddie Dean)

References

External links 

1946 films
1940s English-language films
American black-and-white films
Producers Releasing Corporation films
1946 Western (genre) films
American Western (genre) films
Films directed by Robert Emmett Tansey
Films scored by Karl Hajos
1940s American films